John R. McPherson (1833–1897) was a U.S. Senator from New Jersey from 1877 to 1895. Senator McPherson may also refer to:

Bruce McPherson (born 1944), California State Senate
Tom McPherson (born 1935), Florida State Senate